Panagiotis Zographos was a Greek painter from Vordonia in the Peloponnese who worked from 1836 to 1839 with his two sons, under the instruction of General Makriyannis, to produce several scenes from the Greek battle for independence against the Turks.  Due to a favorable initial response, lithographic reproductions were made for popular distribution. Zographos' paintings encouraged even those not directly involved in the struggle to have nationalistic feelings.  Zographos' works contributed to widespread sentiments of Greek support throughout western Europe, and subsequently helped spur aid provided to the Greek Rebellion by groups like the British Committee.

Notes

Hunt, Lynn, et al.  The Making of the West, Volume C.  3rd ed.  Bedford/ St. Martin's, Boston: 2009.

Greek painters
19th-century Greek people
Year of birth missing
Year of death missing
19th-century Greek painters
People from Laconia